The Corvallis School District (509J) is a school district serving an area of about 190 square miles including the city of Corvallis, Oregon and Adair Village along with large portions of unincorporated Benton County. As of 2016, the district had about 6,600 students at two high schools, two middle schools, eight elementary schools, one charter school, and one alternative school. The two high schools in the district are Corvallis High School and Crescent Valley High School.

History
In 1850 the first school was established in Marysville (renamed Corvallis in 1853). Teacher of the school was A.G. Hovey.

Demographics
In the 2009 school year, the district had 268 students classified as homeless by the Department of Education, or 4.0% of students in the district.

Schools

Elementary
 Adams Elementary School
 Bessie Coleman Elementary School (Hoover/Husky Elementary School formerly)
 Franklin School (K-8)
 Garfield Elementary School
 Kathryn Jones Harrison Elementary School (Jefferson/Jaguar Elementary School formerly)
 Letitia Carson Elementary School (Wilson/Wildcat Elementary School formerly)
 Lincoln Elementary School
 Mountain View Elementary School

Middle
 Cheldelin Middle School
 Linus Pauling Middle School
Franklin School (K-8)

High

 Corvallis High School
 Crescent Valley High School

Charter Schools
Muddy Creek Charter School

Other
 College Hill High School
 Corvallis Online
 Outdoor School
 Summer School

Footnotes

External links
Corvallis School District (official district website)

School districts in Oregon
Education in Corvallis, Oregon
Education in Benton County, Oregon